Hushaaru is a 2018 Indian Telugu-language coming of age adult comedy film written and directed by Sree Harsha Konuganti. It stars Tejus Kancherla, Tej Kurapati, Dinesh Tej, Abhinav Medishetti, Rahul Ramakrishna, Daksha Nagarkar, Priya Vadlamani, Hemal Ingle and Ramya Pasupuleti.

Plot 
Four engineering graduates from middle-class families Arya, Chay, Dhruv and Bunty are clueless about their lives but enjoy being in each other's company, making the most of their energy. Just when things are going smooth, a personal setback hits them hard. How they rise above it and help their friendship stand the test of character and time is the story of Husharu.

Cast 
 Tejus Kancherla as Arya
 Tej Kurapati as Bunty
 Dinesh Tej as Dhruv
 Abhinav Medishetti as Chaitanya "Chay"
Rahul Ramakrishna as Raj Bollam
Daksha Nagarkar as Geeta, Arya's love interest
Priya Vadlamani as Riya, Chay's ex-girlfriend
Hemal Ingle as Sowmya, Dhruv's love interest
Ramya Pasupuleti as Priya, Chay's love interest
Appaji Ambarisha Darbha as Arya's father
Pramodini as Chay's mother
Fish Venkat as Laddanna
Krishna Kranthi as Amaram

Soundtrack 
The songs were composed by Sunny M.R., Radhan, and Varikuppala Yadagiri.

Release 
The film was scheduled to release in August 2018 before being postponed to December of that same year. Raj Surya is directing the Kannada remake of the film starring Chandan Achar, Anup Revanna and Shrimahadev.

Reception

Critical reception 
The Times of India gave the film a rating of three out of five stars and wrote that "Hushaaru is mostly refreshing, captures the humorous side to friendships with zest". Asianet News Telugu gave the film 2.5 of 5 and appreciated the film's screenplay. 123Telugu also gave 2.5 out of 5 and wrote that "Husharu is a routine youthful drama which has a few likable moments."

Box office 
The film grossed  in five days, and ran for 50 days in theatres.

References

External links 

2018 comedy-drama films
Indian comedy-drama films
2010s Telugu-language films
Indian coming-of-age comedy-drama films
Films set in Hyderabad, India
Films set in Telangana
Films shot in Hyderabad, India